Always There may refer to:

 Always There (Judith Durham album), 1997
 Always There (Marti Webb album), 1986
 "Always There" (Kate Alexa song), 2004
 "Always There" (Side Effect song), 1976
 Covered by Incognito featuring Jocelyn Brown, 1991
 "Always There", a 2019 song by Greta Van Fleet